New Evolution Global Tour was the first world tour and second concert tour overall by South Korean girl group 2NE1. It saw shows in 11 cities across 7 countries in Asia and North America spanning from July to December 2012, and promoted all of the group's albums released at the time. The tour attracted more than 170,000 attendees from several different continents.

Background
The tour was officially announced on June 13, 2012 through the YG Family website and was known for being considered the first world tour by a K-pop girl group. The tour kicked off at the Olympics Gymnastics Stadium in Seoul on July 28 and 29, following the group's "I Love You" promotions. The tour was originally set to conclude on December 8 in Kuala Lumpur, however the concert was cancelled due to unresolved technical issues and ended instead on December 1 at the Singapore Indoor Stadium. 

Three-time winner of the MTV Video Music Award for Best Choreography, Travis Payne, served as the main director for production and choreography, along with Divinity Roxx (who previously worked on Beyonce’s world tour) and Michael Cotten (who worked on production design for the Olympic Games). Beatrice Chia-Richmond served as the creative director and concert organizer.

The tour costumes were designed by long-time fashion collaborator Jeremy Scott. The stages were transformed into a theme park, a club, a sporting arena, and a fantasy world which incorporated use of giant inflatable props, conveyor belts, and a video wall—where it simulated a rollercoaster ride during CL and Minzy's performance of "Please Don’t Go".

Reception
The tour was well received following its conclusion, with The New York Times listing the tour's stop at the Prudential Center in New Jersey their second favorite concert in all of 2012. SSTV stated that tour were some of the best concerts among any girl group and Newsis commented the tour was reminiscent of a summer rock festival and "the performance was more complete than anything else".

Set list

Main set
 "I Am the Best"
 "Fire"
 "Clap Your Hands"
 "I Don't Care" (Reggae Mix Ver.)
 "Don't Stop the Music"
 Club DJ (CL solo)
 "Don't Cry" and "You & I" (Bom solo)
 "Follow Me"
 "Please Don't Go" (CL & Minzy)
 "Pretty Boy"
 Dance (Minzy Solo)
 "Kiss" (Dara Solo)
 "It Hurts"
 "Lonely"
 "In the Club"
 "Stay Together"
 "I Love You"
 "Ugly"
 "Let's Go Party"
 "Scream"
 "Hate You"
 "Go Away"
 "Can't Nobody"
Encore
 "I Don't Care"
 "I Am the Best"

Shows

Cancelled shows

Boxscore

Personnel
 Artist: CL, Minzy, Dara, Bom
 Tour organizer: YG Entertainment, Running Into The Sun (Singapore)
 Music director/bassist: Divinity Roxx
 Keyboardist: DANiiVORY
 Engineer: Eric Racy
 Drummer: Gabriel "Manuals" Wallace
 Guitarist: Sharon Aguilar
 Creative director: Beatrice Chia Richmond
 Production: Travis Payne, Divinity Roxx, Michael Cotten
 Tour guest performers : Will.i.am (Los Angeles only)

Broadcast and recordings

2012 2NE1 Global Tour: New Evolution (Live in Seoul) is the second live album of South Korean girl group 2NE1. The album was released on December 4, 2012, by YG Entertainment. The live album sold 10,613 copies in South Korea, while in Japan, it sold 6,000 copies. 

The album was recorded during the group's first world tour New Evolution during their Seoul dates on July 28 and 29 at the Olympic Gymnastics Arena.

Track listing

References

External links
 2NE1 official site

2012 concert tours
2NE1